Sharon is an unincorporated community in Madera County, California.

A post office operated at Sharon from 1898 to 1927. San Francisco financier William Sharon was a promoter of the settlement, that later bore his name.

References

Unincorporated communities in California
Unincorporated communities in Madera County, California